The 2011 Rugby World Cup was an international rugby union tournament played in New Zealand from 9 September to 23 October 2011. Each of the 20 competing nations was required to confirm its 30-man squad by 23 August; only players in these squads were eligible to take part in the tournament.

Players could be replaced for medical or compassionate reasons, but they would be unable to return to the squad. Any replacement players had an enforced stand-down period of 48 hours before they could take the field.

Players marked (c) were the nominated captains for their teams. Number of caps and players' ages are indicated as of 9 September 2011, the tournament's opening day.

The tournament was played during the Super Rugby off-season. Players who were released or changed clubs are out-of-contract with their clubs and finished with their 2011 clubs, and in-contract with their national unions and/or future clubs for the 2012 (2011–12 in the Northern Hemisphere) season. Players were listed with their current affiliations as of the opening day of the tournament on 9 September (with some on-going updates during the tournament).

Three squads were made up entirely of players from home-based clubs. Two of these, Australia and New Zealand, had players who signed with overseas clubs for the 2011–12 northern hemisphere season. However, all players on both squads played for clubs within their country, either in Super Rugby or New Zealand's domestic ITM Cup, in the preceding 2011 season. In addition, these players remained under contract with their national unions until the end of the World Cup. The third such squad, France, consists entirely of players under contract with French clubs in both 2010–11 and 2011–12.

Pool A

Canada
Canada's 30-man squad for the tournament was named on 8 July.

Head coach:  Kieran Crowley

France
Marc Lièvremont announced his 31-man France squad for the tournament on 21 August. David Skrela was injured and subsequently replaced by Jean-Marc Doussain.

Head coach:  Marc Lièvremont

Japan
Japan's 30-man squad for the tournament was named on 22 August. Justin Ives and Ryukoliniasi Holani were ruled out with injury, they were replaced by Yuji Kitagawa and Toetsu Taufa. Tomoki Yoshida and Yuta Imamura were ruled out with injury, they were replaced by Ippei Asada and Bryce Robins.

Head coach:  John Kirwan

New Zealand
New Zealand's 30-man squad for the 2011 Rugby World Cup was announced on 23 August.

On 1 October, Dan Carter sustained a tournament-ending groin injury and was replaced in the squad by Aaron Cruden.

On 9 October, Mils Muliaina sustained a shoulder fracture and Colin Slade suffered a groin tear. Stephen Donald and Hosea Gear were called into the squad to replace them.

Squad and caps are current as of 10 October 2011.

Head coach:  Graham Henry

Tonga
Tonga's 30-man RWC squad was announced on 23 August. Chairman Bob Tuckey allegedly resigned over the proposed selection of former captain Nili Latu.

Head coach:  Isitolo Maka

Pool B

Argentina
Argentina named their squad for the tournament on 10 August 2011. Alvaro Galindo was ruled out with injury and replaced by Genaro Fessia. Gonzalo Tiesi was injured during the England game, he was replaced by Lucas Borges.

Head coach:  Santiago Phelan

England
Martin Johnson announced England's 30-man squad on 22 August. Andrew Sheridan was ruled out due to injury and was replaced by Thomas Waldrom on 25 September.

Team manager:  Martin Johnson

Georgia
Georgia named their 30-man squad on 22 August.

Head coach:  Richie Dixon

Romania
Romania's 30-man RWC squad. Cătălin Fercu was forced to withdraw after his fear of flying prevented him from travelling to New Zealand; Adrian Apostol replaced him.

Head coach:  Romeo Gontineac

Scotland
Scotland's 30-man squad was announced on 22 August 2011.

Head coach:  Andy Robinson

Pool C

Australia
The 30-man squad for the RWC was announced on 18 August, with James Horwill replacing Rocky Elsom as the new captain. Wycliff Palu and Drew Mitchell were ruled out after the Russia test, Hodgson and Turner replaced them.

Head coach:  Robbie Deans

Ireland
Ireland's 30-man squad for the tournament was announced on 22 August 2011. Shane Jennings was called up to replace David Wallace after the latter suffered a knee injury in Ireland's final warm-up Test against England. On 14 September Damien Varley was called up to replace Jerry Flannery after Flannery tore his left calf muscle during a training session.

Head coach:  Declan Kidney

Italy
Nick Mallett announced his 30-man squad for the tournament on 22 July. Tommaso D'Apice returned to Italy after damaging ligaments in his left knee and was replaced by Franco Sbaraglini.

Head coach:  Nick Mallett

Russia
Russia announced their 30-man squad for the tournament on 23 August. Igor Galinovskiy was ruled out with a broken leg, Sergey Trishin replaced him.

Head coach:  Nikolay Nerush

United States
Eddie O'Sullivan announced his 30-man squad for the tournament on 22 August.

Head coach:  Eddie O'Sullivan

Pool D

Fiji
Fiji's 30-man World Cup squad.

Head coach:  Sam Domoni

Namibia
Namibia's 30-man Rugby World Cup squad.

Head coach:  Johan Diergaardt

Samoa
Coach Fuimaono Tafua's 30-man Samoa squad for the tournament was announced on 24 August.

Head coach:  Titimaea Tafua

South Africa
On 23 August, South Africa named a 30-man squad for the 2011 Rugby World Cup in New Zealand. Zane Kirchner replaced the injured François Steyn on 2 October.

Head coach:  Peter de Villiers

Wales
On 22 August, Wales named a 30-man squad for the 2011 Rugby World Cup in New Zealand.

Head coach:  Warren Gatland

Player statistics

Player representation by club

Player representation by league

Average age of squads

Taylor Paris of Canada was the youngest player named to a squad at 18, while Russia's Viacheslav Grachev, 38, was the oldest. However, Paris did not appear in any of Canada's matches, making Wales' 19-year-old George North the youngest to actually appear in the World Cup.

Coaches representation by country

Squad caps

South Africa had the most capped side in the World Cup with 1,224 caps. The most-capped player at the tournament was Brian O'Driscoll of Ireland, who entered the event with 113 caps for Ireland (not counting his appearances with the British and Irish Lions). Second on this list was his teammate Ronan O'Gara with 111.

Notes and references

Squads
Rugby World Cup squads